Good Samaritan usually refers to the Parable of the Good Samaritan, a story in the Christian gospel of Luke that encourages people to help others who are in danger.

The phrases Good Samaritan and The Good Samaritan may also refer to:

Arts, entertainment, and media

Art
 Le Bon Samaritain 1880 painting by Aimé Morot

Film
 The Good Samaritan (film), 2014 crime thriller
 , 1971 Japanese comedy film

Television
 "The Good Samaritan" (Agents of S.H.I.E.L.D.), an episode of the fourth season of Agents of S.H.I.E.L.D.
 The Good Samaritan (Hallmark), a 1954 episode of the Hallmark Hall of Fame
 "The Good Samaritan" (NCIS), NCIS episode
 "The Good Samaritan" (Seinfeld), an episode in the show's third season
 "The Good Samaritan" (The Blacklist), a 2014 episode from TV series The Blacklist

Laws
 Bill Emerson Good Samaritan Act of 1996, a US law intended to encourage food donations
 Good Samaritan laws, several laws in different countries that offer legal protection to those who help others in distress

Religious and social care organizations
 The Evangelical Lutheran Good Samaritan Society, a U.S.-based senior housing and nursing organization, now owned by Sanford Health
 Good Samaritan Society, a Canadian Lutheran social service care home organization
 Sisters of the Good Samaritan, a Roman Catholic congregation in Australia
 Anglican Church of the Good Samaritan, St. John's, Newfoundland and Labrador, Canada
 Episcopal Church of the Good Samaritan, Corvallis, Oregon, United States
 Good Samaritan Hospital (disambiguation), several hospitals
 Good Samaritan Children's Home, an orphanage in the Ukraine

Other uses
 Inn of the Good Samaritan (Khan al-Hatruri), a archeological site (caravanserai) located at the road between Jerusalem and Jericho
 Good Samaritan Catholic College

See also 

 Bad Samaritans (disambiguation)
 Samaritan (disambiguation)
 Good (disambiguation)